Tracy Howard, Jr. (born April 29, 1994) is a former American football free safety who played in the National Football League (NFL).  He played college football at the University of Miami. Howard signed with the Cleveland Browns as an undrafted free agent in 2016.

Early life
A native of Miramar, Florida, Howard attended Miramar High School. Playing wide receiver as a freshman, he was one of the targets of quarterback Geno Smith. He was converted to defensive back in his sophomore year and remained at that position. Regarded as a five-star recruit by Rivals.com, Howard was listed as the No. 1 cornerback prospect in his class.

College career
Howard played college football for the University of Miami.

Professional career

Cleveland Browns
After going undrafted in the 2016 NFL draft, Howard signed with the Cleveland Browns on May 5, 2016. He played in 15 games with three starts recording 20 tackles and one pass defended.

On April 20, 2017, Howard was released by the Browns.

Jacksonville Jaguars
On April 21, 2017, Howard was claimed off waivers by the Jacksonville Jaguars. He was waived on September 2, 2017 and was signed to the practice squad the next day. He was released on September 8, 2017.

Miami Dolphins
On December 21, 2017, Howard was signed to the Miami Dolphins' practice squad. He signed a reserve/future contract with the Dolphins on January 1, 2018. He was waived by the Dolphins on May 10, 2018 with a failed physical.

References

1994 births
Living people
People from Miramar, Florida
American football cornerbacks
Miami Hurricanes football players
Cleveland Browns players
Jacksonville Jaguars players
Miami Dolphins players
Sportspeople from Broward County, Florida
Miramar High School alumni